The Message (Ar-Risālah,  The Message; originally known as Mohammad, Messenger of God) is a 1976 Islamic epic drama film directed and produced by Moustapha Akkad, chronicling the life and times of the Islamic prophet Muhammad through the perspective of his uncle Hamza ibn Abdul-Muttalib and adopted son Zayd ibn Harithah.

Released in separately filmed Arabic- and English-language versions, The Message serves as an introduction to early Islamic history. The international ensemble cast includes Anthony Quinn, Irene Papas, Michael Ansara, Johnny Sekka, Michael Forest, André Morell, Garrick Hagon, Damien Thomas, and Martin Benson. It was an international co-production between Libya, Morocco, Lebanon, Syria and the United Kingdom.

The film was nominated for Best Original Score in the 50th Academy Awards, composed by Maurice Jarre, but lost the award to Star Wars (composed by John Williams). Then-Libyan leader Muammar al-Gaddafi provided the majority of the financial support.

Plot
The film begins with Muhammad sending an invitation to accept Islam to surrounding rulers: Heraclius, the Byzantine Emperor; the Patriarch of Alexandria; the Sasanian Emperor.

Earlier, Muhammad is visited by the angel Gabriel, which shocks him deeply. The angel asks him to start and spread Quran. Gradually, a small number of people in the city of Mecca begin to convert. As a result, more enemies will come and hunt Muhammad and his companions from Mecca and confiscate their possessions. Some of these followers fled to Abyssinia to seek refuge with the protection given by the king there.

They head north, where they receive a warm welcome in the city of Medina and build the first Islamic mosque. They are told that their possessions are being sold in Mecca on the market. Muhammad chooses peace for a moment, but still gets permission to attack. They are attacked but win the Battle of Badr. The Meccans, desiring revenge, fight back with three thousand men in the Battle of Uhud, killing Hamza. The Muslims run after the Meccans and leave the camp unprotected. Because of this, they are surprised by riders from behind, so they lose the battle. The Meccans and the Muslims close a 10-year truce.

A few years later, Khalid ibn Walid, a Meccan general who has killed many Muslims, converts to Islam. Meanwhile, Muslim camps in the desert are attacked in the night. The Muslims believe that the Meccans are responsible. Abu Sufyan comes to Medina fearing retribution and claiming that it was not the Meccans, but robbers who had broken the truce. None of the Muslims give him an audience, claiming he "observes no treaty and keeps no pledge". The Muslims respond with an attack on Mecca with very many troops and "men from every tribe".

Abu Sufyan seeks an audience with Muhammad on the eve of the attack. The Meccans become very scared but are reassured that people in their houses, by the Kaaba, or in Abu Sufyan's house will be safe. They surrender and Mecca falls into the hands of the Muslims without bloodshed. The pagan images of the gods in the Kaaba are destroyed, and the very first azan in Mecca is called on the Kaaba by Bilal ibn Rabah. The Farewell Sermon is also delivered.

Cast
English version

 Anthony Quinn as Hamza
 Irene Papas as Hind bint Utbah
 Michael Ansara as Abu Sufyan ibn Harb
 Johnny Sekka as Bilal ibn Rabah
 Michael Forest as Khalid ibn al-Walid
 André Morell as Abu Talib
 Garrick Hagon as Ammar ibn Yasir
 Damien Thomas as Zayd
 Martin Benson as Abu Jahl
 Robert Brown as Utbah ibn Rabi'ah
 Rosalie Crutchley as Sumayyah
 Bruno Barnabe as Umayyah ibn Khalaf
 Neville Jason as Ja`far ibn Abī Tālib
 John Bennett as Salul
 Donald Burton as 'Amr ibn al-'As
 Earl Cameron as Al-Najashi
 George Camiller as Walid ibn Utbah
 Nicholas Amer as Suhayl ibn Amr
 Ronald Chenery as Mus`ab ibn `Umair
 Michael Godfrey as Baraa'
 John Humphry as Ubaydah
 Ewen Solon as Yasir
 Wolfe Morris as Abu Lahab
 Ronald Leigh-Hunt as Heraclius
 Leonard Trolley as Silk Merchant
 Gerard Hely as Poet Sinan
 Habib Ageli as Hudhayfah
 Peter Madden as Toothless Man
 Hassan Joundi as Khosrau II
 Abdullah Lamrani as Ikrimah
 Elaine Ives-Cameron as Arwa

Arabic version

 Abdullah Gaith as Hamza
 Muna Wassef as Hind
  as Abu Sufyan ibn Harb
 Ali Ahmed Salem as Bilal
 Mahmoud Said as Khalid
 Ahmad Marey as Zayd
 Mohammad Larbi as Ammar
 Hassan Joundi as Abu Jahl
 Sana' Jamil as Sumayyah
 Martin Benson as Khosrau II
 Damien Thomas as Young Christian

Production

Moustapha Akkad considered creating a film about Muhammad and the birth of Islam in 1967. The film's script, written by H.A.L. Craig, was approved in its entirety by Tawfiq al-Hakim, a scholar at Al-Azhar University. However, the film's approval was revoked and referred to as "an insult to Islam". Ahmed Asmat Abdel-Meguid and Mowaffak Allaf, the permanent representatives to the United Nations for Egypt and Syria, praised the film for its depiction of Islam. While creating The Message, director Akkad, who was Muslim, consulted Islamic clerics in a thorough attempt to be respectful towards Islam and its views on portraying Muhammad. It was rejected by the Muslim World League in Mecca, Saudi Arabia.

$10 million was raised for the film from Kuwait, Libya, Morocco, Saudi Arabia, and the United States and it had a final budget of $17 million. Akkad started filming in 1974, with a crew of 300, 40 actors for both English and Arabic language versions, and over 5,000 people for crowd shots. A $700,000 replica of Mecca was built near Marrakesh and Anthony Quinn was paid $1.5 million according to Michael Ansara. Muhammad Ali wanted to play Bilal, but the role was given to Sekka instead with Sekka stating that "Akkad wanted a Moslem with acting experience to play the role" and "how could anyone believe that Ali could be tortured and abused as Bilal was?".

Filming in Morocco started in April 1974, but Moroccan police forced them to stop filming on August 5, as Hassan II of Morocco had been pressured by Faisal of Saudi Arabia. Akkad was granted permission to film in Libya after showing unedited film to Muammar Gaddafi and filmed from October 1974, to May 1975. Gaddafi wanted Akkad to also make a film based on the life of Omar al-Mukhtar. Akkad filmed the English and Arabic versions of the film simultaneously with different actors.

A light bulb on the camera was used during the scenes of characters with Muhammad to represent his immanence. Islamic scholar Khaled Abou El Fadl, who was a friend of Akkad, praised his depiction of Muhammad stating that "To figure out a way to have the prophet become a person without showing him — it was brilliant".

Akkad saw the film as a way to bridge the gap between the Western and Islamic worlds, stating in a 1976 interview:

I did the film because it is a personal thing for me. Besides its production values as a film, it has its story, its intrigue, its drama. Besides all this I think there was something personal, being a Muslim myself who lived in the west I felt that it was my obligation my duty to tell the truth about Islam. It is a religion that has a 700 million following, yet it's so little known about which surprised me. I thought I should tell the story that will bring this bridge, this gap to the west.

Release
In July 1976, five days before the film opened in London's West End, threatening phone calls to a cinema prompted Akkad to change the title from Mohammed, Messenger of God to The Message, at a cost of £50,000. The film was banned in Egypt, Kuwait, and Saudi Arabia. Irwin Yablans distributed the film in the United States.

As the film was scheduled to premiere in the United States, a splinter group of the black nationalist Nation of Islam calling itself the Hanafi Movement staged a siege of the Washington, D.C. chapter of the B'nai B'rith. Under the mistaken belief that Anthony Quinn played Muhammad in the film, the group threatened to blow up the building and its inhabitants unless the film's opening was cancelled. The movie was pulled from theaters on the day of its premiere, but resume playing after the siege ended. Akkad offered to show the film to the Hanafi Muslims and said that he would destroy the film if they found it offensive. The standoff was resolved after the deaths of a journalist and a policeman, but "the film's American box office prospects never recovered from the unfortunate controversy."

A 4K resolution restoration of the film was shown at the Dubai International Film Festival in December 2017, and it was given a theatrical release in Saudi Arabia.

Reception
The film needed to gross $35 million to break even, but only earned $5 million during its theatrical run, with $2 million coming from the United States.

Sunday Times film critic Dilys Powell described the film as a "Western … crossed with Early Christian". She noted a similar avoidance of direct depictions of Jesus in early biblical films, and suggested that "from an artistic as well as a religious point of view the film is absolutely right". Variety praised the "stunning" photography, "superbly rendered" battle scenes and the "strong and convincing" cast, though the second half of the film was called "facile stuff and anticlimactic." Charles Champlin of the Los Angeles Times thought the battle scenes were "spectacularly done" and that Anthony Quinn's "dignity and stature" were right for his role. Gene Siskel of the Chicago Tribune gave it two stars out of four, calling it "a decent, big-budget religious movie. No more, no less." Alexander Walker, writing for the Evening Standard, praised the film and said that "I found myself wholly absorbed by it". Bob Thomas, writing in the Associated Press, stated that the film "is a reverent, plodding (three hours) ultimately rewarding epic of the birth of Islam". 

Richard Eder of The New York Times described the effect of not showing Muhammad as "awkward" and likened it to "one of those Music Minus One records," adding that the acting was "on the level of crudity of an early Cecil B. DeMille Bible epic, but the direction and pace is far more languid." John Pym of The Monthly Film Bulletin wrote: "The unalleviated tedium of this ten-million dollar enterprise (billed as the first 'petrodollar' movie) is largely due to the tawdry staginess of all the sets and the apparent inability of Moustapha Akkad ... to muster larger groups of people on any but two-dimensional planes." Derek Malcolm, writing for The Guardian, criticized the film for its length. 

Muna Wassef's role as Hind in the Arabic-language version won her international recognition.

Awards and nominations
The film was nominated for an Oscar in 1977 for Best Original Score for the music by Maurice Jarre.

Music
The musical score of The Message was composed and conducted by Maurice Jarre and performed by the London Symphony Orchestra.

Track listing for the first release on LP

Side One
 The Message (3:01)
 Hegira (4:24)
 Building the First Mosque (2:51)
 The Sura (3:34)
 Presence of Mohammad (2:13)
 Entry to Mecca (3:15)

Side Two
 The Declaration (2:38)
 The First Martyrs (2:27)
 Fight (4:12)
 Spread of Islam (3:16)
 Broken Idols (4:00)
 The Faith of Islam (2:37)

Track listing for the first release on CD
 The Message (3:09)
 Hegira (4:39)
 Building the First Mosque (2:33)
 The Sura (3:32)
 Presence of Mohammad (2:11)
 Entry to Mecca (3:14)
 The Declaration (2:39)
 The First Martyrs (2:26)
 Fight (4:11)
 The Spread of Islam (3:35)
 Broken Idols (3:40)
 The Faith of Islam (2:33)

Potential remake
In October 2008, producer Oscar Zoghbi revealed plans to "revamp the 1976 movie and give it a modern twist", according to IMDb and the World Entertainment News Network. He hoped to shoot the remake, tentatively titled The Messenger of Peace, in the cities of Mecca and Medina in Saudi Arabia.

In February 2009, Barrie M. Osborne, producer of The Matrix and The Lord of the Rings film trilogies, was attached to produce a new film about Muhammad. The film was to be financed by a Qatari media company and was to be supervised by Sheikh Yusuf al-Qaradawi.

See also

 List of Islamic films
 Battle of Badr
 Battle of Uhud
 List of films about Muhammad

References

Works cited

External links

 
 
 

1976 films
1970s biographical drama films
1970s adventure drama films
1970s historical adventure films
1970s war drama films
Adventure films based on actual events
1970s Arabic-language films
British biographical drama films
British epic films
British historical adventure films
British war drama films
Drama films based on actual events
1970s English-language films
Epic films based on actual events
Films scored by Maurice Jarre
Films about Muhammad
Films about Islam
Films directed by Moustapha Akkad
Films set in the Arabian Peninsula
Films set in the 7th century
Films set in deserts
Films shot from the first-person perspective
Films shot in Libya
Films shot in Morocco
Islam-related controversies
Kuwaiti drama films
Lebanese drama films
Libyan films
Moroccan drama films
Religious adventure films
Religious epic films
War epic films
War films based on actual events
Historical epic films
1976 multilingual films
British multilingual films
1976 directorial debut films
1976 drama films
1970s in Islam
English-language Kuwaiti films
English-language Lebanese films
English-language Libyan films
English-language Moroccan films
1970s British films